Rijeka Crnojevića bridge, also known as Danilo's Bridge is a bridge in Rijeka Crnojevića, Montenegro. The bridge spans the Crnojević River and is one of the most important historical monuments and tourist attractions in Cetinje municipality. The bridge connected Rijeka Crnojevića with the medieval town of Obod, located on a hilltop across the river, which was the location of the first South Slavic printing house.

History
Building of the bridge was commissioned in 1853 by the Montenegrin Prince Danilo, who erected the bridge in memory of his father Stanko Petrović. On the left bank of the river, adjacent to the bridge, Danilo also built a one-story house, popularly called Mostina.
Danilo's bridge replaced the previous wooden bridge across the river, which was built by his predecessor Petar II Petrović-Njegoš.

Characteristics
Danilo's Bridge is a double-arched limestone bridge. Its total length is 43 meters.

References

Bridges in Montenegro
Cetinje Municipality